Aspden may refer to:

 Aspden, the historic name of a valley in Lancashire, England.
 Ray Aspden (born 1934), an English former professional footballer.
 Ruth Spencer Aspden, a British artist
 Dave Aspden, the 45th mayor of Barrie, Ontario, from 2006 to 2010.
 Tommy Aspden (born 1881, deceased), an English professional footballer.
 Walter Aspden, an American soccer inside forward.
 Suzanne Aspden, professor of music at Jesus College, University of Oxford.